Cottage House is a country house in the townland of Clonmoyle East, situated  south-east of Aghabullogue village and  north of Coachford village. The house and demesne were is one of many such houses situated along the valley of the River Lee and its tributaries.

Cottage House was once a Pyne family residence. Lewis (1837) describes the parish of Aghabologue as containing numerous large and elegant houses, to include "the Cottage, of J. Pyne, Esq". The tithe applotment book for the townland of Clonmoyle East records 'John Pyne, Esq.' as occupying 127 acres.

The Landed Estates Database advises that Cottage House was originally a Vize residence, and later occupied by the Pyne family. Following the death of John Pyne in 1837, the property was left to his nephew, Reverend John Paul Lawless, "who took the name and arms of Pyne".

Cottage House was described as a "fine house with good offices attached", built by Rev. John Lawless Pine of Cloyne, and at the time being the residence of Richard Ellard, Esq. A "good deal" of ornamental ground was said to surround it.

By the mid-nineteenth century, the Primary Valuation of Ireland (Griffith's Valuation) records Rev. John Lawless Pine as immediate lessor of the property, which was then unoccupied, and valued at approximately £17. Pyne was also recorded as the occupier of approximately 1 acre of "plantation".

Today it remains a private residence, and is not accessible to the public.

See also
Clonmoyle House
Clonmoyle Mill
Leader's Aqueduct
Athnanangle Bridge
Luskin's Bridge

References

External links
 Acrheritage.info - placemarks (archived)

Country houses in Ireland